Cryphoeca silvicola is a species of dwarf sheet spider in the family Cybaeidae, found in Switzerland, Austria, and Italy.

References

nivalis
Spiders of Europe
Spiders described in 1919